Serdar Topraktepe (born August 25, 1976 in İstanbul) is a Turkish retired footballer who last played for Turkish Super League side Kocaelispor. He played as a striker or as a left sided winger. He wore the jersey number 41, which is also the license plate for Kocaeli.

Professional career
His excellent displays in 2007–08 season for Kocaelispor helped his team to win promotion from TFF First League. Serdar was a skillful forward with flair and fierce shots. He was capped only twice for Turkey at senior level, despite having represented Turkey several times at youth levels. In his long career he had four league and two Turkish Cup titles.

Personal life
Serdar is the brother of the footballer Ömer Topraktepe.

Honours
Beşiktaş
Turkish Super League: 1994–95, 2002–03
Turkish Cup: 1997–98
Turkish Super Cup: 1998

Kocaelispor
Turkish Cup: 2001–02
TFF First League: 2007–08

Bursaspor
TFF First League: 2005–06

References

External links
 
 
 

1976 births
Living people
Footballers from Istanbul
Turkey international footballers
Turkey under-21 international footballers
Turkey youth international footballers
Bursaspor footballers
Kocaelispor footballers
Sivasspor footballers
Beşiktaş J.K. footballers
Süper Lig players
Association football midfielders
Association football forwards
Mediterranean Games silver medalists for Turkey
Competitors at the 1997 Mediterranean Games
Mediterranean Games medalists in football
Turkish footballers